Cladida is a major subgroup of crinoids with a complicated taxonomic history. Cladida was originally applied to a wide assortment of extinct crinoids with a dicyclcic calyx. Under this original definition, cladids would represent a paraphyletic order ancestral to several other major crinoid groups, particularly the living Articulata. More recently, Cladida has been redefined as a monophyletic parvclass of pentacrinoids which encompasses articulates and the extinct Flexibilia (flexibles). Cladids also include various minor taxa such as the hybocrinids and "cyathocrines". As flexibles were not originally considered cladids, the new subgroup Eucladida has been erected for cladids which are more derived than flexibles. Cladida is the sister group to Disparida, another large group of extinct crinoids.

Taxonomy 

 Parvclass Cladida
 Superorder †Porocrinoidea
 Order †Hybocrinida
 Order †Porocrinida
 Superorder †Flexibilia
 Order †Sagenocrinida
 Order †Taxocrinida
 Magnorder Eucladida
 †Ampelocrinida (incertae sedis)
 Superorder †Cyathoformes
 †"Cyathocrinida" (incertae sedis)
 †"Dendrocrinida" (incertae sedis)
 †"Poteriocrinida" (incertae sedis)
 Superorder Articulata
 Order †Encrinida
 Order †Holocrinida
 Order †Millericrinida
 Order †Roveacrinida
 Order †Uintacrinida
 Order Comatulida
 Order Cyrtocrinida
 Order Hyocrinida
 Order Isocrinida

List of genera
 Aaglacrinus
 Aatocrinus
 Abrachiocrinus
 Acariaiocrinus
 Achradocrinus
 Acylocrinus
 Adinocrinus
 Aenigmocrinus
 Agassizocrinacea
 Agassizocrinoidea
 Agassizocrinus
 Aithriocrinus
 Alcimocrinus
 Allosycocrinus
 Alsopocrinus
 Ampelocrinida
 Ampheristocrinus
 Amphipsalidocrinus
 Anarchocrinus
 Anartiocrinus
 Ancyrocrinus
 Anemetocrinus
 Antihomocrinus
 Apektocrinidae
 Arachnocrinus
 Araeocrinus
 Armenocrinus
 Ascetocrinus
 Asymmetrocrinus
 Atelestocrinus
 Atractocrinus
 Atrapocrinus
 Atremacrinus
 Aulocrinus
 Aulodesocrinus
 Bactrocrinites
 Basleocrinus
 Bathericrinus
 Belanskicrinus
 Benthocrinus
 Bicidiocrinus
 Bolbocrinus
 Bollandocrinus
 Botryocrinidae
 Brabeocrinus
 Briseocrinus
 Bronaughocrinus
 Brychiocrinus
 Bursacrinus
 Cadocrinus
 Caelocrinus
 Carcinocrinus
 Carlopsocrinus
 Cathetocrinus
 Ceratocrinus
 Cercidocrinus
 Cestocrinus
 Clathrocrinus
 Clistocrinus
 Codiacrinus
 Coenocystis
 Contignatindocrinus
 Corematocrinus
 Corynecrinus
 Corythocrinus
 Cradeocrinus
 Cranocrinus
 Cricocrinus
 Cromyocrinacea
 Cromyocrinus
 Crotalocrinites
 Cryphiocrinus
 Culmicrinus
 Cyathocrinacea
 Cydrocrinus
 Cyliocrinus
 Dasciocrinus
 Denariocrinus
 Dendrocrinina
 Depaocrinus
 Derbiocrinus
 Dichostreblocrinus
 Dictenocrinus
 Dinotocrinus
 Edapocrinus
 Eifelocrinus
 Eirmocrinus
 Elicrinus
 Enallocrinus
 Eopilidiocrinus
 Epipetschoracrinus
 Eratocrinus
 Ethelocrinus
 Eucladida
 Euerisocrinus
 Eupachycrinus
 Euspirocrinus
 Exaetocrinus
 Exochocrinus
 Exoriocrinus
 Exterocrinus
 Fifeocrinus
 Flexibilia
 Follicrinus
 Forthocrinus
 Gastrocrinus
 Goniocrinus
 Gothocrinus
 Hallocrinus
 Harmostocrinus
 Harrellicrinus
 Hemiindocrinus
 Hemimollocrinus
 Hemistreptacron
 Holcocrinus
 Hosieocrinus
 Hydreionocrinus
 Hydriocrinus
 Hydroporocrinus
 Hylodecrinus
 Idaeumocrinus
 Idosocrinus
 Imitatocrinus
 Indocrinus
 Intermediacrinus
 Jahnocrinus
 Kalpidocrinus
 Kanabinocrinus
 Kansacrinus
 Kooptoonocrinus
 Kopficrinus
 Kophinocrinus
 Laccocrinus
 Lageniocrinus
 Lanecrinus
 Lasiocrinus
 Laudonocrinus
 Lebetocrinus
 Lecythocrinus
 Lekocrinus
 Linobrachiocrinus
 Linocrinus
 Lobalocrinus
 Lopadiocrinus
 Lophocrinacea
 Lophocrinus
 Malaiocrinus
 Manicrinus
 Mantikosocrinus
 Maragnicrinus
 Marathonocrinus
 Mathericrinus
 Menniscocrinus
 Metaffinocrinus
 Metasycocrinus
 Miatschkovocrinus
 Mictocrinus
 Moapocrinus
 Mollocrinus
 Monobrachiocrinus
 Mooreocrinus
 Moscovicrinus
 Myrtillocrinus
 Nacocrinus
 Nactocrinus
 Nanocrinus
 Nassoviocrinus
 Neocatacrinus
 Neolageniocrinus
 Nereocrinus
 Notiocrinus
 Nuxocrinus
 Oligobrachyocrinus
 Ophiurocrinus
 Oxynocrinus
 Pagecrinus
 Paianocrinus
 Parabotryocrinus
 Paracosmetocrinus
 Paracydonocrinus
 Paradelocrinus
 Paragraphiocrinus
 Parapernerocrinus
 Paraplasocrinus
 Parascytalocrinus
 Parastachyocrinus
 Parastephanocrinus
 Parasycocrinus
 Paratimorocidaris
 Parazeacrinites
 Parindocrinus
 Parisangulocrinus
 Parisocrinus
 Pegocrinus
 Pelecocrinus
 Pellecrinus
 Pentaramicrinus
 Pentececrinus
 Permiocrinus
 Pernerocrinus
 Petalambicrinus
 Petschoracrinus
 Phanocrinus
 Pilidiocrinus
 Pirasocrinus
 Platyfundocrinus
 Polygonocrinus
 Porocrinoidea
 Poteriocrinitina
 Premanicrinus
 Prininocrinus
 Proampelocrinus
 Probletocrinus
 Prochoidiocrinus
 Proctothylacocrinus
 Proindocrinus
 Prolobocrinus
 Psilocrinus
 Pskovicrinus
 Pulaskicrinus
 Pumilindocrinus
 Pyrenocrinus
 Ramulocrinus
 Retusocrinus
 Rhabdocrinus
 Rhadinocrinus
 Rhenocrinus
 Rhopalocrinus
 Rhopocrinus
 Rimosidocrinus
 Roemerocrinus
 Saccosompsis
 Sardinocrinus
 Sarocrinus
 Scammatocrinus
 Schedexocrinus
 Schistocrinus
 Schultzicrinus
 Scoliocrinus
 Scotiacrinus
 Sellardsicrinus
 Separocrinus
 Sigambrocrinus
 Simocrinus
 Sphaerocrinus
 Springericrinus
 Stachyocrinus
 Staphylocrinus
 Stinocrinus
 Streblocrinus
 Streptocrinus
 Sublobalocrinus
 Sycocrinites
 Syndetocrinus
 Tarachiocrinus
 Telikosocrinus
 Tenagocrinus
 Terpnocrinus
 Tetrabrachiocrinus
 Tetrapleurocrinus
 Texacrinacea
 Thalamocrinus
 Thenarocrinus
 Thetidicrinus
 Tholocrinus
 Thyridocrinus
 Timorechinus
 Treocrinus
 Trimerocrinus
 Tyrieocrinus
 Ulrichicrinus
 Ureocrinus
 Vasocrinus
 Wetherbyocrinus
 Woodocrinus
 Worthenocrinus
 Yakovlevicrinus
 Zeacrinitacea
 Zeacrinites
 Zeusocrinus
 Zostocrinus
 Zygotocrinus

References

External links 
Cladida in the Paleobiology Database

 
Early Ordovician first appearances
Crinoidea